WXLI (1230 AM) is a radio station broadcasting a country music format. Licensed to Dublin, Georgia, United States.  The station is currently owned by Laurens County Broadcasting Co., Inc and features programming from CBS News Radio and Westwood One.

References

External links

XLI